CBC Vancouver refers to:
CBU (AM), CBU-2-FM and CKZU, CBC Radio One on 690 AM, 88.1 FM and 6160 kHz
CBU-FM, CBC Radio 2 on 105.7 FM
CBUT-DT, CBC Television on channel 2

SRC Vancouver refers to:
CBUF-FM, Première Chaîne on 97.7 FM
CBUX-FM, Espace Musique on 90.9 FM
CBUFT-DT, Ici Radio-Canada Télé on channel 26

See also:
CBC Regional Broadcast Centre Vancouver